Ekti Nadir Naam (English: The Name of a River) is a 2003 documentary-style film directed Anup Singh, exploring the life and work of the great Indian filmmaker Ritwik Ghatak and is set in the partition of Bengal in 1947.

The film won the Silver Dhow Prize at the 5th Zanzibar International Film Festival.

Overview
The Name of a River is Anup Singh's debut work and focuses on a love story between a man and a woman crossing the river between Bangladesh and India - playing the roles of refugees, divine beings and literary and cinematic characters - to understand the mysteries of the events that led to the massacre of half a million people and forced ten million people to migrate across the newly established borders. Covering a huge area of visual, aural and intellectual ground within its 90 minutes, this exquisite film presents its audience with a dreamlike odyssey through a history, a life and a work that we, the viewers, encounter in the shape of stunning landscapes and music, lovers and gods, myths and memories, literature and cinema.

Filming 
The film was shot in India and Bangladesh.

Credits

Cast 
 Shibu Prasad Mukhopadhyay
 Shomi Kaiser
 Supriya Choudhury
 Abhanish Bandopadhyay
 Rosy Afsari
 Kabori Sarwar
 Gita Dey
 Gita Ghatak
 Baisakhi Marjit
 Pratithi Debi
 Meem
 Adrita
 Rousan Zamil
 Tondra Islam
 Tamizuddin Rezvi
 Kalipod Sen

Crew 

 Director: Anup Singh
 Screenplay: Madan Gopal Singh and Anup Singh
 Original Music: Sanjoy Chowdhury
 Cinematography: K.K. Mahajan and Prasann Jain
 Editor: Arghya Kamal Mitra
 Sound Designer: Nihar Samal
 Art Director: Chokas Bharadwaj
 Costume: Madhuja Mukhopadhyay
 Line Producer: Mita Vasisht
 Executive Producers: Steve Brookes, P. Parameswaran and Akhand, Sanwar Murshed.
 Producer: NFDC, British Film Institute, Aashirbad Chalachitra, Bangladesh, The Ministry of External Affairs, India and Riverfilms.
 Distributor: British Film Institute

References

External links 

 

2003 films
2000s Bengali-language films
Indian documentary films
Bengali-language Indian films
Films shot in Bangladesh
Films set in the partition of India
Films shot in India
Films set in 1947
2003 directorial debut films